The Datec Cup Provincial Championship is the highest level of rugby union football competition within Tongan rugby and is a stepping stone for local players into international rugby union.

Tongan Premier Cup teams include Army (Ngaahi Koula) and Ma’ufanga Marist.

References

Rugby union competitions in Tonga
Rugby union competitions for provincial teams